Belvaux-Soleuvre railway station is a railway station serving the towns of Belvaux and Soleuvre, in the commune of Sanem, in south-western Luxembourg.  The station is operated by Chemins de Fer Luxembourgeois, the state-owned railway company.

The station is situated on Line 60, which connects Luxembourg City to the Red Lands of the south of the country.

External links
 Official CFL page on Belvaux-Soleuvre station
 Rail.lu page on Belvaux-Soleuvre station

Sanem
Railway stations in Luxembourg
Railway stations on CFL Line 60